Paresh Kishorchandra Doshi M.S., M.Ch. (born 1963) is a neurosurgeon who practices stereotactic and functional neurological surgery in India.

He is working as the Director of Neurosurgery, at the Jaslok hospital and research centre, Mumbai, India

References

Living people
Indian neurosurgeons
1963 births